
Gmina Grodków is an urban-rural gmina (administrative district) in Brzeg County, Opole Voivodeship, in south-western Poland.

Villages
Apart from the town of Grodków, Gmina Grodków contains the villages and settlements of Bąków, Bogdanów, Gałązczyce, Gierów, Głębocko, Gnojna, Gola Grodkowska, Jaszów, Jędrzejów, Jeszkotle, Kobiela, Kolnica, Kopice, Lipowa, Lubcz, Mikołajowa, Młodoszowice, Nowa Wieś Mała, Osiek Grodkowski, Polana, Przylesie Dolne, Rogów, Starowice, Strzegów, Sulisław, Tarnów Grodkowski, Więcmierzyce, Wierzbna, Wierzbnik, Wojnowiczki, Wojsław, Wójtowice, Żarów, Żelazna and Zielonkowice.

Neighbouring gminas
Gmina Grodków is bordered by the gminas of Kamiennik, Niemodlin, Olszanka, Pakosławice, Przeworno, Skoroszyce and Wiązów.

Twin towns – sister cities

Gmina Grodków is twinned with:
 Beckum, Germany
 Borshchiv, Ukraine

References

Grodkow
Brzeg County